Dante Carver (born January 17, 1977, in Brooklyn, New York) is an American actor working in Japan.

In 2008, Carver was voted the most popular male actor in a TV commercial in Japan, beating Takuya Kimura, who had previously held the top position for eight consecutive years.

Private life
A native of New York City, Carver attended Virginia Commonwealth University in Richmond, Virginia, studying International Business.

On August 4, 2010, Carver married former model Akiko Matsumoto. They formally celebrated the marriage in a wedding ceremony in April 2011.

TV commercials
 Diet Coke, 2006
 SoftBank Mobile (May 2006–Present),  aka ,  aka 
 UHA Mikakuto (November 2007)

TV series
 Kaze ni Maiagaru Vinyl Sheet (風に舞いあがるビニールシート) (NHK, May 2009–), UNHCR worker
 "Be Pon Kiki" ([Fuji TV], April 2008~)
 "Yamato Nadeshiko Shichi Henge" (ヤマトナデシコ七変化) ([TBS], April - March 2010) (Episode 10)

Films
 Kansen Rettō (感染列島); English title: Pandemic (2009), WHO physician Klaus David
 Kaze ga tsuyoku fuiteiru (風が強く吹いている); English title: Feel the wind (2009)
 My Darling Is a Foreigner (2010)
 Nanase Futatabi: The Movie (2010) as Henry
 Kamen Rider × Kamen Rider Fourze & OOO: Movie War Mega Max (2012), Foundation X Member
 Shōjo no Piero ㊤ (少女のピエロ ㊤); English Title: The Doll (2017) as Ijiro (voice)
 Ultra Galaxy Fight, The Destined Crossroad (2022) as Ultraman Scott (voice)

CD releases
 "Nonbiri Ikō" (のんびり行こう) (Pony Canyon, September 2008) with Mike Maki

References

External links 

Official blog

1977 births
Living people
Expatriate television personalities in Japan
African-American male actors
American male actors
American expatriates in Japan
21st-century African-American people
20th-century African-American people